Mastraccio or Mastracchio is a surname. Notable people with the surname include:

 Anne-Marie Mastraccio, American politician
 Richard Mastracchio (born 1960), American astronaut